The Port Huron Flags were a minor league professional ice hockey team located in Port Huron, Michigan. The Flags competed in the United Hockey League for two seasons from 2005 to 2007. The Flags' mascot was a bear named Slapshot, based on the Hanson Brothers from the movie Slap Shot.

Owners attempted to sell the Flags in May 2007, but negotiations with several groups failed. The team officially ceased operations on May 18, 2007.

Season-by-season results

References

External links
Port Huron Flags at HockeyDB

Defunct United Hockey League teams
Ice hockey clubs established in 2005
Ice hockey clubs disestablished in 2007
Professional ice hockey teams in Michigan
2005 establishments in Michigan
2007 disestablishments in Michigan
Port Huron, Michigan